Isak Johan Emerik Gustaf Stenberg (7 January 1873 – 31 July 1927) was a Swedish draftsman, painter and folklorist.

Biography 

Stenberg was born in Stockholm in 1873. His father, Gustaf, was a Commissioner in the Swedish National Audit Office. He studied art at the Royal Swedish Academy of Fine Arts from 1891 to 1896 while also taking lessons at the Konstnärsförbundets skola ('Artists' Association School'). What would become a major factor in his later career was a visit he made to Dalarna in 1894. He was captivated by the folk culture there and settled in the village of Ullvi, near Leksand, in 1897; decorating his farm with locally made furniture and craft objects. A painting he produced at that time (Wake in Leksand) was successfully shown at the General Art and Industrial Exposition of Stockholm. This was followed by several lengthy study trips to France, Germany and the Low Countries from 1898 to 1901.

He married Gully Elisabeth Hård in 1905. They had three sons and one daughter.

In 1906, he became a member of the Royal Swedish Academy. He was named a deputy professor in 1908 and a full professor the year after. Opposition to the Academy's traditional teaching methods eventually led him to resign. For many years following that, he was a successful portrait painter.

In 1927, Stenberg died in Stockholm. He is buried at the Norra begravningsplatsen there. In 1932, the Royal Swedish Academy held a major retrospective. His portraits may be seen at the Academy, the Nordic Museum, the National Archives of Sweden, the Gothenburg Museum of Art, the Nationalmuseum and several others.

References

Further reading 
Svenskt konstnärslexikon part V, pg. 254, Allhems Förlag, Malmö.

External links 

 Biography from the Nordisk familjebok @ Project Runeberg
 More works by Stenberg @ ArtNet

1873 births
1927 deaths
Swedish painters
Artists from Stockholm
Swedish portrait painters
Burials at Norra begravningsplatsen